Krishnam is a 2018 Indian Malayalam-language family drama thriller film written, directed and filmed by Dinesh Baboo from a story by P. N. Balaram, who also produced the film. The film features Akshay Krishnan, Ashwarya Ullas, Mamitha Baiju, Sai Kumar, and Shanthi Krishna in lead roles. The film was released in India on 18 May 2018 and was released straight online overseas. Tamil version was released in 15 March 2019.

Synopsis
Krishnam is based on a real-life incident. Belief and strong conviction will make you a Victor. Based on a true incident happened in Trichur, Kerala. Portrays the intense and pristine relationship of a father and son, interspersed with moments of happiness, pain, horror, and peace.

Cast
 Akshay Krishnan
 Hrishikesh as Abhi
 Ashwarya Ullas
 Mamitha Baiju
 Ankit Harikrishnan as Akshays Friend
 Sai Kumar as Akshays father
 Shanthi Krishna as Akshays Mother
 Sharon Thomas as Akshay's Friend
 Renji Panicker
 V. K. Prakash
 Mukundan
 Anjali Nair
 Vijayakumar

Soundtrack
The film's music is by Hari Prasad in 3 languages, 11 songs, and 9 singers

 "Mazha Megham"- Vijay Yesudas
 "Thoo Manju" - Vineeth Sreenivasan
 "Madthu Madthu" - Tippu

References

External links
 
Krishnam on East Coast Daily
Krishnam on Manorama Online

2018 films
Indian films based on actual events
2010s Malayalam-language films
Films directed by Dinesh Baboo